The 1990 Pennsylvania gubernatorial election was held on November 6, 1990. Incumbent Democratic governor Robert P. Casey easily defeated Republican Barbara Hafer. Governor Casey defeated Hafer by a margin of 35.29%, and carried 66 out of 67 Pennsylvania counties.

Primary elections
Incumbent Bob Casey was challenged by Philip J. Berg, an attorney and perennial candidate from Montgomery County. Endorsed Republican candidate Barbara Hafer, Auditor General and former candidate for Lt. Governor, won a surprisingly close race over Peg Luksik, an outspoken opponent of abortion rights.

Candidates

Democratic
Bob Casey, incumbent Governor
running mate: Mark Singel, incumbent Lieutenant Governor

Republican
Barbara Hafer, State Auditor General
running mate: Harold Mowery, State Representative

Campaign
Casey had maintained enormous popularity in the state, was considered to have a generally positive record from his first term as governor, and was endorsed by major newspapers statewide, including The Philadelphia Inquirer. In addition, Casey had the traditionally strong backing of urban voters and organized labor, and performed well in many heavily Republican, rural counties, as he was seen as a relatively conservative populist. 

The campaign briefly turned ugly when Hafer, a pro-choice Republican who had attempted to position herself as the more liberal candidate, referred to Casey as a "redneck Irishman." Her comment, which was widely reported, helped to alienate both rural voters and those of Irish descent. Unable to gain a funding foothold or to carve out a strong public image, and trailing in the polls by forty percent on election day, Hafer was subsequently defeated by Casey by a large margin. 

Casey, who had achieved the second-largest gubernatorial landslide in the state in the 20th century, had won almost every county, losing only Montgomery County by just 586 votes.

Results

Notes

References

 

1990
Gubernatorial
Pennsylvania